Canadian indie rock and new wave band Metric have released eight studio albums, seven extended plays, 25 singles, two video albums, 29 music videos and three soundtrack albums.

Albums

Studio albums

Soundtrack albums

Video albums

Extended plays
 Mainstream EP (1998)
 Static Anonymity (2001)
 Live at Metropolis (2007)
 Plug In, Plug Out (2009)
 Spotify Acoustic EP (2010)
 Spotify Covers EP (2010)
 iTunes Session EP (2011)
 The Shade EP [Cassette only] (2015)

Singles

Promotional singles

Other charting songs

Notes

Music videos

References

External links
 Metric Official site

Discographies of Canadian artists